"Silly-Go-Round" is the fifth single of J-pop duo FictionJunction Yuuka. It was released on May 10, 2006.

This single includes the opening theme song for the anime series .hack//Roots, as well as "angel gate", a song from the musical  in which Yuuka Nanri, the vocalist of FictionJunction Yuuka, stars. Both songs were composed by Yuki Kajiura. Its catalog number is VICL-35889.

Track listing
From FlyingDog.

Charts 
Oricon Sales Chart (Japan)

 Sales after 3 weeks

References

External links 
Victor Animation Network: discography entry

2006 singles
FictionJunction Yuuka songs
Songs written by Yuki Kajiura
2006 songs
Victor Entertainment singles